The Whole 19 Yards is a British game show that aired on ITV from 17 April to 5 June 2010, hosted by Vernon Kay and the late Caroline Flack.

Format
Four contestants compete through three rounds to answer general knowledge questions and complete physical challenges. In each round, they begin at one end of the stage, while the buzzers they must use to answer the questions are at the other end, 19 yards away. To reach the buzzers, they must traverse a challenge course that has been set up on the stage for that round.

Kay announces a category and begins to ask a series of questions. As soon as a contestant thinks they know the answer to a particular question, they start onto the course. The first contestant to hit their buzzer and answer their question correctly advances to the next round, while a miss passes control to the next contestant who reaches their buzzer. Each contestant may answer only the question on which they started the course. After a correct answer is given or everyone misses a question, the remaining contestants play the round again with a new category. On occasion, one or more complications ("twists") are added to these subsequent runs without the contestants being notified of them.

In each round, the last contestant who fails to answer a question is eliminated from the game and leaves with nothing. After the third round, the last remaining contestant plays for £100,000 in the "Final 19 Yards" challenge.

Games
These are a list of games used so far in the series.
Key
 First Round - Four Players
 Second Round - Three Players
 Third Round - Head to Head

The Final 19 Yards
The buzzer is initially placed next to the contestant, mounted to a motorized platform on which Kay stands. A maximum of five questions are played during this round, each consisting of a category and a series of clues to an item within it. After Kay finishes reading the first clue, he and the buzzer begin to move slowly across the floor; the contestant must run and hit the buzzer as soon as they think they know the answer, stopping the movement. Each correct answer increases the contestant's winnings (£5,000, £10,000, £20,000, £50,000, £100,000). After each correct answer, the contestant may either end the game and keep the accumulated money, or continue and risk it on the next question. The contestant must begin from the original starting line on each new question, while Kay and the buzzer start to move from wherever they stopped on the previous one. An incorrect answer at any point ends the game and reduces the contestant's winnings two levels below the value of the missed question. If the buzzer moves a total of 19 yards, the game ends and they lose everything.

International versions

References

External links

2010 British television series debuts
2010 British television series endings
2010s British game shows
ITV game shows
Television series by Banijay
Television shows set in London